Fusepoint Managed Services was a provider of managed IT solutions for companies throughout North America, that was acquired by Savvis, Inc in 2010 . Founded in 1999, Fusepoint (formerly known as RoundHeaven Communications) has within 5 years grown by over 1,400% and in 2008 was ranked 46th by PROFIT magazine in a list of Canada's 100 fastest-growing companies. Fusepoint is currently ranked as the 83rd largest technology company according to Globe's Branham Group. Fusepoint is a privately held company with offices and data centres in Vancouver, Toronto, Montreal and Quebec City.

Fusepoint operates as a managed service provider (MSP), helping to safeguard and guarantee access to a company's data and mission critical applications through a variety of services including infrastructure hosting, disaster recovery, and firewall security.

Fusepoint has one primary investor. M/C Venture Partners, a Boston, Massachusetts-based venture capital firm, invested US$20 million in Fusepoint in July 2001 and an additional US$10 million in 2004.

Savvis, Inc. announced on June 1, 2010, that it had entered into a definitive agreement to acquire Fusepoint for approximately $124.5 million in cash subject to working capital adjustments. The acquisition was completed on June 16, 2010.

Fusepoint acquisitions include Toronto-based Worldwide Online, a hosting and professional services firm in March, 2005 and Montreal-based outsourcing firm Versus in October 2004. The company regularly conducts polls in Canada on topics pertaining to identity theft, business continuity, and disaster recovery.

Fusepoint's video tour of its facility on YouTube has received a 5 star rating and 100,000 views.

Special Certifications

Payment Card Industry Data Security Standard (P.C.I. DSS)

On November 28, 2007, Fusepoint announced they had become one of the very few managed hosting providers in Canada to become Payment Card Industry Data Security Standard (PCI DSS) compliant . Fusepoint is recognized by Visa  as a Tier 1 Payment Card Industry Certified Service Provider (page 18).

VMware Hosting Services

In December 2007, Fusepoint began offering managed hosting solutions on both physical and virtual servers by joining the VMware Service Provider Program (VSPP) and offering VMware to both large enterprises and small to medium-sized businesses .

Microsoft Partnership

Fusepoint is recognized by Microsoft as a Gold Certified Partner, offering Microsoft SharePoint Application Development and Hosting services capabilities.

References

External links
 Fusepoint - Official Homepage
 Profit Magazine- 20th Annual Canada's Fastest Growing Companies
 Web Host Industry News Report

Information technology companies of Canada
Technology companies established in 1999
Companies based in Toronto
Privately held companies of Canada
1999 establishments in Ontario